SS John Henry was a Liberty ship built in the United States during World War II. She was named after John Henry, the eighth Governor of Maryland and member of the United States Senate.

Construction
John Henry was laid down on 14 April 1942, under a Maritime Commission (MARCOM) contract, MCE hull 45, by the Bethlehem-Fairfield Shipyard, Baltimore, Maryland; she was sponsored by Mrs. F.D. Purse, the wife of the MARCOM district marine surveyor of Baltimore, and was launched on 18 June 1942.

History
John Henry was allocated to Eastern Steamship Co., on 6 July 1942. On 29 September 1947, she was laid up in the James River Reserve Fleet, Lee Hall, Virginia. On 23 May 1954, she was withdrawn from the fleet to be loaded with grain under the "Grain Program 1954", she returned loaded on 30 May 1954. On 24 June 1960, John Henry was withdrawn to be unload, she returned empty on 11 July 1960. On 27 October 1960, she was withdrawn from the fleet to be loaded with grain under the "Grain Program 1960", she returned loaded on 9 November 1960. On 22 April 1963, John Henry was withdrawn to be unload, she returned empty on 2 May 1963. She was sold for scrapping on 12 September 1972, to Isaac Varela, for $80,007. She was removed from the fleet, 6 November 1972.

References

Bibliography

 
 
 
 

 

Liberty ships
1942 ships
Ships built in Baltimore
James River Reserve Fleet
James River Reserve Fleet Grain Program